Live at Red Rocks is the first live album by John Tesh. Tesh performed with the Colorado Symphony Orchestra at Red Rocks Amphitheatre in Colorado. Rodney Batdorf of AllMusic writes in his review that "Live at Red Rocks is the ultimate John Tesh album, capturing the new age keyboardist at his peak."

Track listing

Musicians 
 John Tesh – Yamaha grand piano, keyboards
 Tom Coster, Jr. – synthesizers
 Tim Heintz – synthesizer programming 
 Dave Hernandez – sequencing
 Paul Viapiano – acoustic guitar, electric guitar
 Tim Landers – bass
 Dave Hooper – drums
 Brian Kilgore – percussion
 Everette Harp – saxophones
 Stuart Blumberg – principal trumpet
 Charlie Bisharat – electric violin, acoustic violin, music director, additional orchestration 
 John Bisharat – orchestra arrangements and conductor 
 Johnny Carl – additional orchestration
 Jeffrey Silverman – additional orchestration
 Barbara Nahlik – orchestra contractor 
 Colorado Symphony – orchestra

Production 
 John Tesh – producer 
 Ross Pallone – recording, mixing 
 Chris Chandler – assistant engineer, road manager 
 Rail Rogut – assistant engineer
 Chris Bellman – mastering at Bernie Grundman Mastering (Hollywood, California)
 Guy Charbonneau/Le Mobile – location recording 
 Dirk Schubert – house mixer
 Steve Kallos – monitor technican
 TC Electronic – digital effects 
 Charles William Bush – photography 
 Hillary Hope – art direction 

All track information and credits were taken from the CD liner notes.

References

External links
John Tesh Official Site
Red Rocks Official Site

John Tesh albums
1995 live albums
Albums recorded at Red Rocks Amphitheatre